Kinsley Scott Bingham (December 16, 1808October 5, 1861) was a U.S. Representative, a U.S. Senator, and the 11th governor of Michigan.

Early life in New York
Bingham (whose first name is sometimes spelled Kingsley) was born to the farmer family of Calvin and Betsy (Scott) Bingham in Camillus, New York in Onondaga County.  He attended the common schools and studied law in Syracuse.  In 1833, while still in New York, Bingham married Margaret Warden, who had recently moved with her brother Robert Warden and family from Scotland.

Life and politics in Michigan
Bingham moved with his wife, in 1833 to Green Oak Township, Michigan where he was admitted to the bar and began a private practice.  In 1834, his only child with Margaret, Kinsley W. Bingham (1838–1908), was born and his wife died four days later. He engaged in agricultural pursuits and held a number of local offices including justice of the peace, postmaster, and first judge of the probate court of Livingston County.

Bingham became a member of the Michigan State House of Representatives in 1837, was reelected four times and served as speaker of the house in 1838–1839, and 1842.  In 1839, Bingham married Mary Warden, the younger sister of his first wife, and in 1840 their only child was born, James W. Bingham (1840–1862).

In 1846, he was elected as a Democratic Representative from Michigan's 3rd congressional district to the 30th and 31st Congresses, serving from March 4, 1847, to March 4, 1851.  He was chairman of the Committee on Expenditures in the Department of State in the 31st Congress.  He was instrumental in securing approval for building the Beaver Island Head Lighthouse on the south end of Beaver Island in Lake Michigan.  He was strongly opposed to the expansion of slavery and was one of minority of Democrats who supported the Wilmot Proviso.  Bingham was not a candidate for re-election in 1850 and resumed agricultural pursuits.  He affiliated himself with the Free Soil Party and was later a Republican.

Gubernatorial and senate career
In 1854, Bingham was elected as the 11th (and first Republican) governor of Michigan and was re-elected in 1856; he is among the first Republicans to be elected governor of any state.  He was known as the farmer-Governor of Michigan and was instrumental in establishing the Agricultural College of the State of Michigan (today, Michigan State University) and other educational institutions such as the State Reform School.  Also during his four years in office, a personal liberty law was sanctioned, legislation that regulated the lumber industry was authorized, and several new counties and villages were established. He was also a delegate from Michigan to the Republican National Convention in 1856 that nominated John C. Fremont for U.S. President, who lost to Democrat James Buchanan.

Bingham was elected as a Republican to the United States Senate in 1858 and served in the 36th and 37th Congresses from March 4, 1859, until his death on October 5, 1861.  He was chairman of the Committee on Enrolled Bills in the 37th Congress.  He campaigned actively for the election of U.S. President Abraham Lincoln in 1860.

Death and legacy
He died in Green Oak while in office at age 52  and was originally interred at a private family graveyard in Livingston County.  He was reinterred at Old Village Cemetery of Brighton, Michigan.

There are three townships named for him in Michigan:
Bingham Township, Clinton County, Michigan
Bingham Township, Huron County, Michigan
Bingham Township, Leelanau County, Michigan

Memorials
A painting of Bingham now hangs in the Michigan State Capitol.

See also
List of United States Congress members who died in office (1790–1899)

References

Further reading
McDaid, William. "Kinsley S. Bingham and the Republican Ideology of Slavery, 1847–1855." Michigan Historical Review 16 (Fall 1990): 43–73
"The rise and fall of the Democratic party." Speech of Hon. Kinsley S. Bingham, of Michigan. Delivered in the United States Senate, May 24, 1860.

External links

Political Graveyard
Memorial Library 
National Governors Association

1808 births
1861 deaths
American justices of the peace
Michigan postmasters
Michigan state court judges
Governors of Michigan
Speakers of the Michigan House of Representatives
Politicians from Syracuse, New York
People of Michigan in the American Civil War
Republican Party United States senators from Michigan
Republican Party members of the Michigan House of Representatives
Michigan Free Soilers
Democratic Party members of the United States House of Representatives from Michigan
Republican Party governors of Michigan
People from Camillus, New York
Burials in Michigan
19th-century American politicians
People from Livingston County, Michigan
19th-century American judges